Cookin' up Hits is the fourth studio album by Liz Anderson.  All twelve songs were written by Anderson ("I'm a Lonesome Fugitive" was cowritten by her husband Casey) and included her performances of two songs that were the debut hits for her daughter Lynn Anderson, "Ride Ride, Ride" and "If I Kiss You".  The album peaked at #18 on the Billboard country LP chart and the lone single release, "Tiny Tears" was a #24 top 40 country hit for Liz.  The album was released as a music download October 13, 2017 by Sony Legacy.

Track listing
All tracks composed by Liz Anderson; except where indicated
"Never Ever" (Liz Anderson, Donna Austin)
"Tiny Tears"
"I'm a Lonesome Fugitive" (Liz Anderson, Casey Anderson)
"On Your Way To Gone"
"The Spirit Of Christmas"
"Ride Ride Ride"
"The Chiseler"
"Come Walk In My Shoes"
"If I Kiss You (Will You Go Away)"
"Never Is A Long Long Day"
"Behind My Back"

Chart positions

References

1967 albums
RCA Victor albums
Liz Anderson albums
Albums produced by Felton Jarvis